Woman In A Purple Coat or The Purple Coat is a painting by Henri Matisse from 1937. It depicts Matisse's assistant Lydia Delectorskaya. This painting is an example of Henri Matisse's mature decorative style. Matisse depicts his model and companion of many years, Lydia Delectorskaya, in an exotic Moroccan clothing, surrounded by a complex of abstract design and exotic color. This is an example of one of the final groups of oil paintings in Matisse's career, in 1950 he stopped painting oil paintings in favor of creating paper cutouts.

References

1937 paintings
Paintings by Henri Matisse
Paintings in the collection of the Museum of Fine Arts, Houston